Gray Summit is an unincorporated community and census-designated place (CDP) in Franklin County, Missouri, United States. The population was 2,701 at the 2010 census. Also called "Gray's Summit", it was founded by Daniel Gray of New York, who built a hotel here in 1845.  It is located on Missouri Route 100 just north of Interstate 44.

Geography
Gray Summit is located in northeastern Franklin County along Missouri Route 100 and just north of Interstate 44.

Demographics

As of the census of 2000, there were 2,640 people, 953 households, and 739 families residing in the CDP. The racial makeup of the CDP was 97.80% White, 0.38% African American, 0.23% Native American, 0.15% Asian, 0.08% Pacific Islander, 0.38% from other races, and 0.98% from two or more races. Hispanic or Latino people of any race were 0.34% of the population.

There were 953 households, out of which 37.5% had children under the age of 18 living with them, 64.3% were married couples living together, 8.4% had a female householder with no husband present, and 22.4% were non-families. 17.3% of all households were made up of individuals, and 5.9% had someone living alone who was 65 years of age or older. The average household size was 2.77 and the average family size was 3.12.

In the CDP, the population was spread out, with 27.8% under the age of 18, 8.1% from 18 to 24, 34.0% from 25 to 44, 21.2% from 45 to 64, and 9.0% who were 65 years of age or older. The median age was 35 years. For every 100 females, there were 98.5 males. For every 100 females age 18 and over, there were 97.0 males.

The median income for a household in the CDP was $46,648, and the median income for a family was $53,875. Males had a median income of $38,810 versus $21,723 for females. The per capita income for the CDP was $17,503. About 4.8% of families and 5.1% of the population were below the poverty line, including 5.2% of those under age 18 and 15.5% of those age 65 or over.

References

Census-designated places in Franklin County, Missouri
Census-designated places in Missouri